Provincial Trunk Highway 9 (PTH 9) is a provincial primary highway located in the Canadian province of Manitoba.  It runs from Winnipeg (where it meets with Route 52) north to Gimli.

The highway is known as Main Street between Winnipeg and Selkirk, as this is the name of the road within both of those cities, and has a suburban character as a 4-lane, mostly undivided highway with numerous residences and businesses.  At Selkirk, the highway turns off to bypass the city and becomes more of a rural highway.  The bypass around Selkirk is known as the "Selkirk By-Pass". The road that runs through Selkirk is known as PTH 9A (Main Street also continues as PTH 9A, and then as PR 320 until PTH 4, where it becomes Breezy Point Road).

Route description

PTH 9 begins in the Rural Municipality of West St. Paul at the Winnipeg city limits, with the road continuing southwest into the city as Winnipeg Route 52 (Route 52 / Main Street).

PTH 9 temporarily widens to a divided highway in Parkdale at around an intersection with PTH 27 (Parkdale Road, leads to St. Andrews Airport) and PR 238 (River Road, follows along the western banks of the river and provides access to River Road Provincial Park), before passing through the hamlets of Lees Crossing, St. Andrews (where it has an intersection with PR 410 (St. Andrews Road)), and bypassing Lockport  to the west at an intersection with PTH 44. The highway becomes divided again as it travels through Little Britain, where it passes by Lower Fort Garry and has a junction with PTH 67, and Old England, where it splits off on a 2-lane bypass around the southern and western sides of the city of Selkirk, having intersections with PR 230 and PTH 4, with the old route through the city known as PTH 9A.

The highway travels through Petersfield, where it crosses Netley Creek, and Netley, where it has an intersection with PTH 17, before the begins following the southwestern coastline of Lake Winnipeg. It passes through the beach communities of Chalet Beach, Sans Souci, Matlock (where it has an intersection with PR 232, a loop road off PTH 9 that directly follows the shoreline), and Dunnottar (where it has an intersection with PR 225).

PTH 9 now travels directly through the center of downtown Winnipeg Beach, reuniting with PR 232 not too far from Winnipeg Beach Provincial Park, and having an intersection with PR 229. The highway enters the New Iceland region as it crosses into the Rural Municipality of Gimli, winding its way up the lake's shoreline as it travels through Sandy Hook, where it has an intersection with PR 519, and Husavik before entering the town of Gimli. It passes through several neighborhoods and grazes the western tip of downtown, which follows Centre Street, before PTH 9 comes to and end at an intersection between PR 231 and PR 222, with the road continuing north as PR 222 while PR 231 (N Fifth Avenue) connects it to PTH 8.

History
Originally, PTH 9 followed what is now Routes 42 (then known as Route 40) and 57 through Winnipeg.  Outside the Perimeter, the route followed Provincial Road 204 to Lockport, where it would join its present alignment.

Today's PTH 9 between Winnipeg and Lockport was previously PTH 1 prior to 1958, and PTH 4 between 1958 and 1968. The Selkirk By-Pass between PR 230 and PTH 9A was not signed.  In 1968, PTH 9 was moved to its present alignment.

At Gimli, the roadway continues northerly as Provincial Road 222.

Major intersections

References

External links 
Official Name and Location - Declaration of Provincial Trunk Highways Regulation - The Highways and Transportation Act - Provincial Government of Manitoba
Official Highway Map - Published and maintained by the Department of Infrastructure - Provincial Government of Manitoba (see Legend and Map#3)
Google Maps Search - Provincial Trunk Highway 9

009